The suiriri flycatcher (Suiriri suiriri) is a species of bird in the family Tyrannidae found in semi-open habitats in South America. It was formerly split into two species; the Chaco suiriri (S. suiriri) and the Campo suiriri (S. affinis). Suiriri originates from Guaraní, where it is a generic name used for several medium-sized tyrant flycatchers.

Taxonomy
The suiriri flycatcher was described by the French ornithologist Louis Vieillot in 1818 under the binomial name Muscicapa suiriri. The type locality is Puerto Pinasco in Paraguay. It has traditionally been split into two species, the southern Chaco suiriri (S. suiriri) with a white belly and the northern Campo suiriri (S. affinis) with a yellow belly and a contrastingly pale rump, but they interbreed widely where they come into contact, and consequently most authorities now consider them to be part of a single species. It has been suggested that the taxon bahiae from north-eastern Brazil, which is considered a subspecies of S. affinis when that species is split from S. suiriri, actually is the result of hybridization between suiriri and affinis. For the most part it resembles the latter, but it lacks a contrastingly pale rump as the former.

The chapada flycatcher is a cryptic species that was included within the suiriri flycatcher until it was described in 2001. While both these species are relatively noisy, only the chapada flycatcher has the distinctive wing-lifting display.

Three subspecies are recognised:
 Suiriri suiriri. burmeisteri Kirwan, Steinheimer, Raposo & Zimmer, KJ, 2014 – south Suriname, central Brazil and northwest Bolivia
 Suiriri suiriri bahiae (von Berlepsch, 1893) – east Brazil
 Suiriri suiriri suiriri (Vieillot, 1818) – east Bolivia, southwest Brazil, Paraguay, Uruguay and north Argentina

Distribution and habitat
The suiriri flycatcher occurs in a wide range of semi-open habitats such as Chaco, Caatinga and Cerrado, but generally avoids humid habitats such as the Amazon Rainforest. It ranges from northern Argentina, through Uruguay, Paraguay, eastern Bolivia, to a large part of eastern Brazil, with disjunct populations in southern Guyana, Amapá, and near the lower section of the Amazon River and central Madeira River. These disjunct populations are associated with remnant patches of relatively dry woodland and savanna that largely – or entirely – are surrounded by humid Amazonian forests.

It is fairly common locally, and consequently considered to be of least concern by BirdLife International.

References

Further reading

</ref>

External links

 
 
 
 
 
 
 

Tyrannidae
Birds of the Caatinga
Birds of the Cerrado
Birds of the Pantanal
Birds of Brazil
Birds of Bolivia
Birds of Paraguay
Birds of Uruguay
Birds of Argentina
Birds of the Guianas
Birds described in 1818
Taxa named by Louis Jean Pierre Vieillot